ISO 3166-2:IL is the entry for Israel in ISO 3166-2, part of the ISO 3166 standard published by the International Organization for Standardization (ISO), which defines codes for the names of the principal subdivisions (e.g., provinces or states) of all countries coded in ISO 3166-1.

Currently for Israel, ISO 3166-2 codes are defined for 6 districts.

Each code consists of two parts, separated by a hyphen. The second part is one or two letters. The code for Yerushalayim is assigned based on its English name, Jerusalem.

Current codes
Subdivision names are listed as in the ISO 3166-2 standard published by the ISO 3166 Maintenance Agency (ISO 3166/MA).

ISO 639-1 codes are used to represent subdivision names in the following administrative languages:
 (he): Hebrew
 (ar): Arabic

Click on the button in the header to sort each column.

 Notes

See also
 Subdivisions of Israel
 FIPS region codes of Israel

External links
 ISO Online Browsing Platform: IL
 Districts of Israel, Statoids.com

2:IL
ISO 3166-2
Israel geography-related lists